Looking for Her (or Je vous souhaite d'être follement aimée) is a 2015 French drama film directed by Ounie Lecomte.

Plot
Elisa, physiotherapist, went to live with her young son, Noé, in Dunkirk, the town where she was born under X. A few months earlier, she began researching her biological mother, but the woman refused to reveal her identity. In search of an unknown mother, her past and their history, Elisa did not give up and wants to understand as luck will change their expectations ...

Cast

References

External links
 

2015 films
French drama films
Films set in Dunkirk
2015 drama films
2010s French films